Cùl Beag is a mountain in Coigach, in the Northwest Highlands of Scotland. It is 15 km north of Ullapool and lies to the south of Cùl Mòr, and to the east of the better-known but lower Stac Pollaidh.

Cùl Beag is within the Drumrunie Estate, which was purchased in a community buyout in 2005. It is now owned by the Assynt Foundation.

References

Corbetts
Marilyns of Scotland
Mountains and hills of the Northwest Highlands
Mountains and hills of Highland (council area)